The Space Age is a period encompassing the activities related to the Space Race, space exploration, space technology, and the cultural developments influenced by these events, beginning with the launch of Sputnik 1 on October 4th, 1957, and continuing to the present.

This period is characterized by changes in emphasis on particular areas of space exploration and applications. Initially, the United States and the Soviet Union invested unprecedented amounts of resources in breaking records and being first to meet milestones in crewed and uncrewed exploration. The USA established the National Aviation and Space Administration (NASA) and the USSR established Kosmicheskaya programma SSSR to meet these goals. This period of competition gave way to cooperation between those nations and emphasis on scientific research and commercial applications of space-based technology.

Eventually other nations became space-fairing. They formed organizations such as the European Space Agency (ESA), the Japan Aerospace Exploration Agency (JAXA), the Indian Space Research Organization (ISRO), and the China National Space Administration (CNSA). When the USSR dissolved the Russian Federation continued their program as Roscosmos.

Recently some journalists have used the phrase, "New Space Age" in reference to a resurgence of innovation and public interest in space exploration as well as commercial applications of low Earth orbit (LEO) and more distant destinations. New developments include the participation of billionaires in crewed space travel, including space tourism.

History

The 1950s-1970s
The Space Age was an era of new military, political, technological, and scientific developments which began with the Soviet Union's October 4, 1957 launch of Earth's first artificial satellite Sputnik 1. Weighing  and orbiting the Earth once every 98 minutes,. The Space Race between the United States and the Soviet Union began in 1957 with the launching of the first artificial satellite Sputnik 1. The race resulted in rapid advances in rocketry, materials science, and other areas. One of the underlying motivations for the space race was military. The two nations were also in a nuclear arms race following the Second World War. Both nations made use of German missile technology and scientists from their missile program. The advantages, in aviation and rocketry, required for delivery systems were seen as necessary for national security and political superiority.

The cold war era competition between the US and USSR is one of the reasons the space age happened at that time. Since then the space age continues for the generation of scientific knowledge, the innovation and creation of markets, inspiration, and agreements between the space-fairing nations. Other reasons for the continuation of the space age are defending Earth from hazardous objects like asteroids and comets.

Much of the technology developed for space applications has been spun off and found additional uses, such as memory foam. In 1958 the United States launched its first satellite, Explorer 1. The same year President Dwight D. Eisenhower created the National Aeronautics and Space Administration, commonly known as NASA.

Prior to the first attempted human spaceflight, various animals were flown into outer space to identify potential detrimental effects of high g-forces in takeoff and landing, microgravity, and radiation exposure at high altitudes.

The Space Race reached its peak with the Apollo program that captured the imagination of much of the world's population. From 1961 to 1964, NASA’s budget was increased almost 500 percent, and the lunar landing program eventually involved some 34,000 NASA employees and 375,000 employees of industrial and university contractors. The Soviet Union proceeded tentatively with its own lunar landing program which it did not publicly acknowledge, partly due to internal debate over its necessity and the untimely death (in January 1966) of Sergey Korolev, chief engineer of the Soviet space program.

The landing of Apollo 11 was watched by over 500 million people around the world and is widely recognized as one of the defining moments of the 20th century. Since then, public attention has largely moved to other areas.

The last major leap of the Space Age was the Skylab and Salyute programs, which established the first space stations for the U.S. and USSR in Earth Orbit following termination of both country's moon programs.

The 1970s to 2010s 
At the concluson of the Apollo program, crewed flights from the United States were rare, then ended while the shuttle program was getting ready to kick into gear, and the space race had been over since the Apollo-Soyuz test project of 1975, started a period of US-Soviet Cooperation. The Soviet Union continued using the Soyuz spacecraft.

The shuttle program restored spaceflight to the U.S. following the Skylab program, but the Space Shuttle Challenger disaster in 1986 marked a significant decline in crewed Shuttle launches. Following the disaster, NASA grounded all Shuttles for safety concerns until 1988. During the 1990s funding for space-related programs fell sharply as the remaining structures of the now-dissolved Soviet Union disintegrated and NASA no longer had any direct competition.

Since then, participation in space launches has increasingly widened to include more governments and commercial interests. Since the 1990s, the public perception of space exploration and space-related technologies has been that such endeavors are increasingly commonplace.

NASA permanently grounded all U.S. Space Shuttles in 2011. NASA has since relied on Russia and SpaceX to take American astronauts to and from the International Space Station.

Modern era

In the early 21st century, the Ansari X Prize competition was set up to help jump-start private spaceflight. The winner, Space Ship One in 2004, became the first spaceship not funded by a government agency.

Several countries now have space programs; from related technology ventures to full-fledged space programs with launch facilities. There are many scientific and commercial satellites in use today, with thousands of satellites in orbit, and several countries have plans to send humans into space. Some of the countries joining this new race are France, India, China, Israel and the United Kingdom, all of which have employed surveillance satellites. There are several other countries with less extensive space programs, including Brazil, Germany, Ukraine, and Spain.

As for the United States space program, NASA is currently constructing a deep-space crew capsule named the Orion. NASA's goal with this new space capsule is to carry humans to Mars. The Orion spacecraft is due to be completed in the early 2020s. NASA is hoping that this mission will “usher in a new era of space exploration.”

Another major factor affecting the current Space Age is the privatization of space flight. A significant private spaceflight company is SpaceX which became the proprietor of one of world's most capable operational launch vehicle when they launched their current largest rocket, the Falcon Heavy in 2018. Elon Musk, the founder and CEO of SpaceX, has put forward the goal of establishing a colony of one million people on Mars and the company is developing its Starship launch vehicle to facilitate this. Since the Demo-2 mission for NASA in 2020 in which SpaceX launched astronauts for the first time to the International Space Station, the company has maintained an orbital human spaceflight capability. Blue Origin, a private company founded by Amazon.com founder Jeff Bezos, is developing rockets for use in space tourism, commercial satellite launches, and eventual missions to the Moon and beyond. Richard Branson's company Virgin Galactic is concentrating on launch vehicles for space tourism. A spinoff company, Virgin Orbit, air-launches small satellites with their LauncherOne rocket. Another small-satellite launcher, Rocket Lab, has developed the Electron rocket and the Photon satellite bus for sending spacecraft further into the Solar System.

Elon Musk has the stated that the main reason he founded SpaceX is to make humanity a multiplanetary species, and cites reasons for doing it including: To ensure the long-term continuation of our species and protecting the "light of consciousness". He also said, You want to wake up in the morning and think the future is going to be great - and that’s what being a spacefaring civilization is all about. It’s about believing in the future and thinking that the future will be better than the past. And I can’t think of anything more exciting than going out there and being among the stars.

The Space Age marked a major comeback and return with the launch of NASA's Space Launch system during the Artemis 1 mission on November 16th, 2022; it marked the first time a human rated spacecraft had been to the Moon in nearly 50 years, as well as the return of United States capability to get astronauts to the Moon with the Space Launch System and Orion.

Chronology

Earlier suborbital spaceflights

Some vehicles reached suborbital space much earlier than the launch of Sputnik. In June 1944, a German V-2 rocket became the first manmade object to enter space, albeit only briefly. In March of 1926 American rocket pioneer Robert H. Goddard launched the world's first liquid fuel rocket, but it did not reach outer space. Also in the 1920s the world's first large-scale experimental rocket program, Opel-RAK, was initiated under the leadership of Fritz von Opel and Max Valier. Speed records for ground and rail vehicles were achieved in 1928 and von Opel piloted the world's first public flight of a rocket plane, Opel RAK.1. The Great Depression put an end to the Opel-RAK program but it nevertheless had a strong and long-lasting impact on later spaceflight pioneers, in particular on Wernher von Braun who would eventually head the Nazi era V2 program.

Since Germans undertook the sub-orbital V-2 rocket flight in secrecy, it was not initially public knowledge. Also, the German launches, as well as the subsequent sounding rocket tests performed in both the United States and the Soviet Union during the late 1940s and early 1950s, were not considered significant enough to define the start of the space age because they did not reach orbit. A rocket powerful enough to reach orbit could also be used as an intercontinental ballistic missile, that could deliver a warhead to any location on Earth. Some commentators claim this is why the orbital standard is commonly used to define when the space age began.

Cultural influences

Arts and architecture

The Space Age is considered to have influenced:
 Automotive design: Virgil Exner's Forward Look, 1957-1961
 Googie architecture
 Space Age fashions by André Courrèges, Pierre Cardin, Paco Rabanne, Rudi Gernreich, Emanuel Ungaro, Jean-Marie Armand, Michèle Rosier, and Diana Dew
 Furniture design of the 1950s and '60s by Eero Saarinen, Arne Jacobsen, Eero Aarnio, and Verner Panton
 Amusement park attractions,  such as TWA Moonliner and Mission: Space.
 Cold War playground equipment

Music
The Space Age also inspired musical genres: 
Space age pop
Space music
Space rock
Space-themed music

See also

 SEDS
 Information Age
 Jet Age
 Atomic Age

References

External links

Interactive media
 .

 
Spaceflight
Historical eras
20th century
1957 introductions
1957 in spaceflight